The Narraguagus River is a river located in the U.S. state of Maine with its mouth in the Narraguagus Bay of the Gulf of Maine. It flows through the town of Cherryfield and was formerly well known for its sport fly fishing for Atlantic salmon.  This was a traditional highlight of late spring with anglers gathering from afar for the Memorial Day weekend fishing kick-off.  The native salmon run has been much reduced due to many different factors.

During its course, the river passes Lead Mountain before flowing into and out of Beddington Lake.

See also
 List of Maine rivers

References

Rivers of Hancock County, Maine
Rivers of Washington County, Maine
Cherryfield, Maine